The 2009–10 KB Extraliga competition was a Czech domestic rugby club competition operated by the Česká Rugbyová Unie (ČSRU). It began on August 29, 2009 with a match between Tatra Smíchov and Petrovice at the Stadion ragby Císařka in Prague, and continued through to the final at the Synot Tip Arena on June 19, 2010.

Bystrc and Zlín were promoted, with the former having won the KB První Liga in 2008 and the latter the promotion playoffs, while Havířov and Přelouč were relegated.

Both Bystrc and Zlín went directly back to the První Liga, after occupying the bottom two places on the log at the end of the season.

The final saw "home side" Slavia Prague narrowly beating defending champions Tatra Smíchov 11-10.

Competition format
Each club played every other club twice, with matches being played over eighteen rounds.

The teams

Table

Schedule and results
From the official ČSRU site. Within each weekend, matches are to be listed in the following order:
 By date.
 If matches are held on the same day, by kickoff time.
 Otherwise, in alphabetic order of home club.

Rounds 1 to 5
Round 1
 29 August, 11:00 — Tatra Smíchov 49 – 0 Petrovice
 29 August, 14:00 — Praga 33 – 23 Vyškov
 29 August, 14:00 — Slavia Prague 29 – 16 Dragon Brno
 29 August, 14:00 — Sparta Prague 36 – 9 Bystrc
 29 August, 15:00 — Říčany 46 – 9 Zlín

Round 2
 12 September, 11:00 — Tatra Smíchov 17 – 0 Říčany
 12 September, 14:00 — Bystrc 10 – 29 Slavia Prague
 12 September, 14:00 — Vyškov 17 – 22 Sparta Prague
 12 September, 14:00 — Zlín 10 – 29 Praga
 12 September, 15:00 — Petrovice 5 – 50 Dragon Brno

Round 3
 5 September, 13:00 — Říčany 45 – 7 Petrovice
 19 September, 11:00 — Praga 16 – 28 Tatra Smíchov
 19 September, 15:00 — Slavia Prague 30 – 13 Vyškov
 20 September, 13:00 — Sparta Prague 50 – 3 Zlín
 20 September, 15:00 — Dragon Brno 57 – 13 Bystrc

Round 4
 26 September, 11:00 — Tatra Smíchov 48 – 0 Sparta Prague
 26 September, 14:00 — Vyškov 8 – 47 Dragon Brno
 26 September, 14:00 — Zlín 3 – 50 Slavia Prague
 26 September, 15:00 — Petrovice 14 – 6 Bystrc
 26 September, 15:00 — Říčany 23 – 18 Praga

Round 5
 6 September, 15:00 — Dragon Brno 83 – 12 Zlín
 3 October, 13:00 — Praga 61 – 0 Petrovice
 3 October, 14:00 — Bystrc 19 – 30 Vyškov
 3 October, 14:00 — Slavia Prague 20 – 18 Tatra Smíchov
 3 October, 15:00 — Sparta Prague 22 – 23 Říčany

Rounds 6 to 10
Round 6
 10 October, 12:00 — Tatra Smíchov 40 – 21 Dragon Brno
 10 October, 14:00 — Praga 20 – 23 Sparta Prague
 10 October, 15:00 — Petrovice 0 – 39 Vyškov
 10 October, 15:00 — Říčany 10 – 12 Slavia Prague
 10 October, 15:00 — Zlín 15 – 20 Bystrc

Round 7
 12 October, 12:00 — Bystrc P – P Tatra Smíchov
 17 October, 14:00 — Dragon Brno 32 – 25 Říčany
 17 October, 14:00 — Slavia Prague 31 – 12 Praga
 17 October, 14:00 — Sparta Prague 41 – 8 Petrovice
 17 October, 14:00 — Vyškov 67 – 0 Zlín

Round 8
 24 October, 15:00 — Říčany 41 – 8 Bystrc
 28 October, 11:00 — Sparta Prague 14 – 15 Slavia Prague
 28 October, 11:00 — Tatra Smíchov 88 – 6 Vyškov
 28 October, 12:00 — Praga 23 – 15 Dragon Brno
 28 October, 13:00 — Petrovice 39 – 15 Zlín

Round 9
 31 October, 14:00 — Bystrc 10 – 56 Praga
 31 October, 14:00 — Dragon Brno 17 – 22 Sparta Prague
 31 October, 14:00 — Slavia Prague 35 – 7 Petrovice
 31 October, 14:00 — Vyškov 10 – 55 Říčany
 31 October, 14:00 — Zlín 6 – 38 Tatra Smíchov

Round 10
 7 November, 11:00 — Petrovice 0 – 67 Tatra Smíchov
 7 November, 14:00 — Bystrc 6 – 33 Sparta Prague
 7 November, 14:00 — Dragon Brno 12 – 33 Slavia Prague
 7 November, 14:00 — Vyškov 10 – 50 Praga
 7 November, 14:00 — Zlín 5 – 97 Říčany

Rounds 11 to 15
Round 11
 20 March, 13:00 — Praga 57 - 13 Zlín
 20 March, 13:00 — Sparta Prague 31 - 0 Vyškov
 20 March, 14:00 — Říčany 25 – 8 Tatra Smíchov
 20 March, 14:00 — Slavia Prague 70 – 12 Bystrc
 20 March, 15:00 — Dragon Brno 28 - 10 Petrovice

Round 12
 27 March, 11:00 — Tatra Smíchov 41 - 8 Praga
 27 March, 14:00 — Vyškov 6 - 45 Slavia Prague
 27 March, 14:00 — Zlín 3 – 47 Sparta Prague
 27 March, 14:30 — Petrovice 3 – 56 Říčany
 27 March, 15:00 — Bystrc 10 – 41 Dragon Brno

Round 13
 17 April, 14:00 — Bystrc 10 – 15 Petrovice
 17 April, 14:00 — Praga 8 – 40 Říčany
 17 April, 14:00 — Slavia Prague 109 – 0 Zlín
 17 April, 15:00 — Dragon Brno 7 – 12 Vyškov
 17 April, 15:00 — Sparta Prague 15 – 22 Tatra Smíchov

Round 14
 4 April, 14:00 — Zlín 6 – 43 Dragon Brno
 24 April, 11:00 — Tatra Smíchov 13 – 3 Slavia Prague
 24 April, 14:00 — Říčany 19 - 15 Sparta Prague
 24 April, 14:00 — Vyškov 19 – 30 Bystrc
 24 April, 15:00 — Petrovice 13 – 52 Praga

Round 15
 1 May, 13:00 — Sparta Prague 24 – 28 Praga
 1 May, 14:00 — Bystrc 48 – 3 Zlín
 1 May, 14:00 — Vyškov 31 – 8 Petrovice
 1 May, 15:00 — Dragon Brno 13 – 20 Tatra Smíchov
 1 May, 15:00 — Slavia Prague 6 – 13 Říčany

Rounds 16 to 18
Round 16
 8 May, 11:00 — Tatra Smíchov 78 – 0 Bystrc
 8 May, 14:00 — Praga 19 – 22 Slavia Prague
 8 May, 14:00 — Říčany 31 – 5 Dragon Brno
 8 May, 14:00 — Zlín 10 – 27 Vyškov
 8 May, 15:00 — Petrovice 12 – 59 Sparta Prague

Round 17
 29 May, 11:00 — Vyškov 8 – 66 Tatra Smíchov
 29 May, 13:30 — Zlín 18 – 32 Petrovice
 29 May, 14:00 — Bystrc 3 – 29 Říčany
 29 May, 14:00 — Slavia Prague 40 – 10 Sparta Prague
 29 May, 15:00 — Dragon Brno 34 – 19 Praga

Round 18
 11 April, 13:00 — Říčany 33 – 8 Vyškov
 19 May, 18:30 — Sparta Prague 27 – 0 Dragon Brno
 23 May, 13:00 — Tatra Smíchov 88 – 10 Zlín
 23 May, 14:00 — Praga 64 – 18 Bystrc
 23 May, 15:00 — Petrovice 20 – 41 Slavia Prague

Playoffs

Semi-finals

Final

References

External links
 KB Extraliga 2009–2010

2009–10 in Czech rugby union
2009-10
Czech